Elections to the Labour Party's Shadow Cabinet (more formally, its "Parliamentary Committee") took place on 18 November 1982. In addition to the 15 members elected, the Leader (Michael Foot), Deputy Leader (Denis Healey), Labour Chief Whip (Michael Cocks), Labour Leader in the House of Lords (Lord Cledwyn of Penrhos), and Chairman of the Parliamentary Labour Party (Jack Dormand) were automatically members.

All 15 members elected the previous year were retained. The value of being the top loser dropped as by-elections would be held for future vacancies under a change in the Parliamentary Labour Party's rules. The results for 20 of the 40 candidates are listed below:

Footnotes
Notes

References

1982
Labour Party Shadow Cabinet election
Labour Party (UK) Shadow Cabinet election